2020 Tillabéri attack may refer to: 

Battle of Chinagodrar in January
May 2020 Tillabéri attacks
Kouré shooting in August